Sara Sara (Aymara sara an ounce, Quechua sara maize, the reduplication indicates that there is a group or a complex of something) is a  mountain in the Wansu mountain range in the Andes of Peru. It is situated in the Apurímac Region, Antabamba Province, in the districts of Antabamba and Juan Espinoza Medrano. Sara Sara lies south of Quri Waraqa and Huch'uy Sara Sara.

References 

Mountains of Peru
Mountains of Apurímac Region